Silambinathanpettai is a village and panchayat of Cuddalore district, Tamil Nadu, India, located between Cuddalore and Panruti. The village has a population of 5,000. Silambinathanpettai is located near Patthirakottai and Saathamampattu. The village is located between Cuddalore, Panruti, Neyveli depicting its position to be at heart of these triangularly positioned cities.

The village is known for the Cashew and Jackfruit. Silambinathanpettai has more than 500 hectares of cashew trees. The name Silambinathanpettai was said to have been  coined during the 16th century  due to the emergence of a number of youth with skills in the art silambam. The village pin code is 607102. Silambinathanpettai Grampanchayat villages (Silambinathanpettai, Pathirakottai, Arachekuppam, Pattikuppam, Puthukuppam, Pazhaya Pathirakottai).

References 

the village being major producer of jackfruit, is hit by thane cyclone recently in 2011. various studies says revival from cyclone may take decades, since trees of this kind are less rigid to cyclonic wind of 125kmph.

Villages in Cuddalore district